The Golden Staters is a Barbershop quartet that won the 1972 SPEBSQSA international competition.

Members
Tenor: Gary Harding
Lead: Milt Christensen
Bass: Mike Senter
Baritone: Jack Harding

External links
 AIC entry (archived)

Barbershop quartets
Barbershop Harmony Society